The Mexican National Lightweight Championship (Campeonato Nacional de Peso Ligero in Spanish) is a Mexican professional wrestling singles championship created and sanctioned by Comisión de Box y Lucha Libre Mexico D.F. ("the Mexico City Boxing and Wrestling Commission" in Spanish). Although the Commission sanctions the title, it does not promote the events in which the title is defended. As it is a professional wrestling championship, it is not won legitimately; it is instead won via a scripted ending to a match or awarded to a wrestler because of a storyline. Since the title was brought back after being inactive for approximately four years it has been contested for in the Mini-Estrellas division exclusively. All title matches take place under two out of three falls rules as is tradition in Mexico.

The Mexican National Lightweight Championship was created in 1934, making it one of the oldest wrestling championships still active today. Consejo Mundial de Lucha Libre (CMLL; Spanish for World Wrestling Council) has the promotional control of the championship while the Commission only serves to approve the champions and supervise championship matches. Jack O'Brien was recognized as the first champion in 1934, after winning a tournament sanctioned by Comisión de Box y Lucha Libre Mexico D.F. and promoted by CMLL. The championship has been vacated on a number of occasions, most notably four times because the champion moved up a weight class, once because the champion was not a Mexican citizen and once because the reigning champion, Guerrero Samurai, was killed in a car accident.

Eléctrico is the current Mexican National Lightweight Champion, having defeated Pequeño Nitro in a tournament final on August 13, 2013. He is the 49th overall champion and the 39th person to hold the title. Rodolfo Ruiz and Taro are tied for the most reigns as champion, with three in total; Mishima Ota has the shortest reign, at 1 day. Black Shadow holds the record for the longest individual reign, at over 1,901 days, while Juan Diaz held the championship 1,979 days divided over two reigns.

Championship tournaments

2008 Mexican National Lightweight Tournament

In 2008 the Mexican National Lightweight Championship was reintroduced after being vacant since 2005. CMLL held two Torneo cibernetico elimination matches, one on September 9 and one on September 16 to determine the finalists. Pierrothito won the first torneo cibernetico by eliminating Pequeño Olimpico in the end. Mascarita Dorada won the second torneo cibernetico, eliminating Pequeño Black Warrior in the last fall. On September 23, 2009 Pierrothito defeated Mascarita Dorada to win the championship, becoming the first Mini-Estrella to win the Mexican National Lightweight Championship.

Cibernetico – September 9, 2008

Cibernetico – September 16, 2008

2013 Mexican National Lightweight Tournament

On June 24, 2013 CMLL announced that the Mexican National Lightweight Championship had been vacated, without stating specifically why previous champion Pierrothito had been stripped of the championship. They also announced a 12-man tournament to determine a new champion that would start on July 30 with a six-man torneo cibernetico elimination match and a second six-man cibernetico the following week. The winners of each block faced off on August 13, 2013 to determine the new champion. The finals saw Eléctrico defeat Pequeño Nitro to win the championship.

Cibernetico – July 30, 2013

Cibernetico – August 6, 2013

Title history

Combined reigns

Key

Footnotes

References
General sources
[G1] – 
[G2] – 
Specific

External links
CMLL World Middleweight Title history at
wrestling-titles.com
Cagematch.net

Consejo Mundial de Lucha Libre championships
Lightweight wrestling championships
Mexican national wrestling championships
National professional wrestling championships